Dendrometrini is a tribe of click beetles in the family Elateridae, including some formerly recognized subfamily or tribal-rank groups such as Athoinae, Denticollinae, and Hemicrepidiini now all reduced to subtribal rank.

Selected genera

Alcimathous
Athous
Cidnopus
Crepidophorus
Denticollis
Diacanthous
Elathous
Gambrinus
Harminius
Hemicrepidius
Limonius
Megathous
Nothodes
Pheletes
Pseudocrepidophorus
Socotrelater
Stenagostus
Tetralimonius
Yukara

References

Beetle tribes
Dendrometrinae